Sevastopol is an unincorporated community in Franklin Township, Kosciusko County, in the U.S. state of Indiana.

History
Sevastopol was platted in 1855. Its name commemorates the Siege of Sevastopol (1854–55). A post office was established at Sevastopol in 1858, and remained in operation until it was discontinued in 1902.

Geography
Sevastopol is located in the far southwest corner of the county, five miles from Mentone, seven from Burket, and 15 from Warsaw, the county seat.

References

Unincorporated communities in Kosciusko County, Indiana
Unincorporated communities in Indiana